1981 JSL Cup Final was the sixth final of the JSL Cup competition. The final was played at Utsunomiya Football Stadium in Tochigi on July 19, 1981. Mitsubishi Motors and Toshiba won the championship.

Overview
Mitsubishi Motors and Toshiba won the Championship. Mitsubishi Motors is 2nd title, Toshiba is 1st title.

Match details

See also
1981 JSL Cup

References

JSL Cup
1981 in Japanese football
Urawa Red Diamonds matches
Hokkaido Consadole Sapporo matches